Wrestling at the 2013 Canada Summer Games was in Sherbrooke, Quebec at the Cégep de Sherbrooke.  It was held from the 6 to 8 August.  There were 26 events of wrestling.

Medal table
The following is the medal table for rowing at the 2013 Canada Summer Games.

Results

Men

Women

See also
2013 in wrestling

References

External links 

2013 Canada Summer Games
2013 in sport wrestling
2013 Canada Games
Wrestling in Canada